Batil, also spelled bateel or battil, is a traditional type of sailing vessel from Kuwait with a fiddle-headed bow and a high sternboard.

References

Arabic words and phrases
Boat types
Ships of Kuwait